Francis Robert Naali (born 12 January 1972) is a Tanzanian marathon runner, who won the gold medal at the 2002 Commonwealth Games held in Manchester in a time of 2:11:58 hours.

References

External links 
 

1972 births
Living people
Tanzanian male long-distance runners
Tanzanian male marathon runners
Athletes (track and field) at the 2002 Commonwealth Games
Athletes (track and field) at the 2006 Commonwealth Games
Commonwealth Games gold medallists for Tanzania
Commonwealth Games medallists in athletics
Medallists at the 2002 Commonwealth Games